B. J. Cohen (born June 10, 1975) is a former American football offensive lineman and defensive lineman in the Arena Football League (AFL).

High school career
Cohen was born in Conley, Georgia. He attended Cedar Grove High School in Ellenwood, Georgia, and lettered three times in football, twice in basketball, and once in baseball.

College career
Cohen played college football at Marshall University, where he was a three-time All-American.

Professional career
Cohen has played with the Orlando Predators (1999–2002), Tampa Bay Storm (2003), New Orleans VooDoo (2004–2005), Kansas City Brigade (2006), and returned to the Predators for a final season in 2008.

Coaching career
In 2013, Cohen was named the offensive and defensive line coach for the VooDoo. In April 2022, Cohen was named as head football coach of Bonnabel High School in Kenner, LA.

References

External links
 Kansas City Brigade's player bio
 Stats
 B. J. Cohen Honored By Kansas City Brigade

1975 births
Living people
People from Clayton County, Georgia
Sportspeople from the Atlanta metropolitan area
Players of American football from Georgia (U.S. state)
American football offensive linemen
American football defensive linemen
Marshall Thundering Herd football players
Orlando Predators players
Tampa Bay Storm players
New Orleans VooDoo players
Kansas City Brigade players
Coaches of American football from Georgia (U.S. state)
New Orleans VooDoo coaches